The 70th Directors Guild of America Awards, honoring the outstanding directorial achievement in feature films, documentary, television and commercials of 2017, were presented on February 3, 2018 at Beverly Hilton, Beverly Hills, California. The nominations for the television and documentary categories were announced on January 10, 2018, while the nominations for the film categories were announced on January 11, 2018.

Comedian Judd Apatow hosted the ceremony, and Don Mischer served as the DGA Awards Chair.

Winners and nominees

Film

Television

Commercials

Frank Capra Achievement Award
 Dwight Williams

Franklin J. Schaffner Achievement Award
 Jim Tanker

Honorary Life Member
 Michael Apted

See also
 Producers Guild of America Awards
 Writers Guild of America Awards

References

External links
 

Directors Guild of America Awards
2017 film awards
2017 television awards
2017 in American cinema
2017 in American television
2018 awards in the United States